Albert Chartier was a French racing cyclist. He finished in last place in the 1907 Tour de France.

References

External links

Year of birth missing
Year of death missing
French male cyclists
Place of birth missing